Michael Anthony Farr (born August 8, 1967) is a former American football wide receiver who played a total of four seasons, three with the Detroit Lions of the National Football League and one with the New England Patriots. He known as the Third Down Receiver because of his many clutch catches on Third Down. He attended University of California, Los Angeles where he was an academic and athletic star graduating with honors in 4 years while breaking the school record for receptions in a single season.

Family life
Farr is part of a family full of professional football players.  Farr is the son of former NFL player Mel Farr, the nephew of former AFL and NFL player Miller Farr, and the younger brother of former NFL player Mel Farr, Jr.  Farr and his brother are members of Alpha Phi Alpha fraternity.

The Farr lineage is not just success in football, but has become synonymous with cars.  Mel Farr, Sr. became a successful auto dealer after finishing his career with the Detroit Lions. In 2002, Mike Farr started Second Chance Motors to address the inconsistencies in financing subprime customers in the used vehicle segment of the market place.  On January 8, 2013, the U.S. Securities and Exchange Commission agreed to settle its claims against Farr, who allegedly helped investment adviser Roy Dixon Jr. and his private equity firm steal $3.1 million from three Michigan pension funds.

Footnotes

1967 births
Living people
Players of American football from Santa Monica, California
American football wide receivers
UCLA Bruins football players
Detroit Lions players
New England Patriots players